Thanaleng station, also known as Dongphosy station (Ban Dong Phosy in Lao), is a railway station in Dongphosy village, Hadxayfong District, Vientiane Prefecture, Laos. The station opened on 5 March 2009, becoming part of the first international railway link serving Laos. Originally intended for use as a passenger station, Lao officials have stated their intention to convert it to a rail freight terminal to provide a low-cost alternative to road freight, the main mode of transport for goods entering Thailand. The station provides a connection between Vientiane and the capital cities of three other ASEAN nations: Thailand, Malaysia, and Singapore, and several major Southeast Asian ports.

History
On 20 March 2004, an agreement between the Thai and Lao governments was signed to extend the State Railway of Thailand's Northeastern Line from a junction just south of Nong Khai to Thanaleng, a town on the Lao side of the Mekong. The Thai government agreed to finance the line through a combination of grants and loans. The estimated cost of the Nong Khai–Thanaleng line was US$6.2 million, of which 70% was financed by Thai loans. Construction formally began on 19 January 2007, and test trains began running on 4 July 2008. Formal inauguration occurred on 5 March 2009. Thanaleng Station is the only station of the Bangkok–Thanaleng rail route on the Lao side of the border. The former terminus at Nong Khai and the spur to it was abandoned. Before the construction of the railway across the Friendship Bridge, passengers had to cross the Mekong by ferry. The remains of the former Nong Khai terminus are still present and are visible on Google Earth.

Proposed extension
On 22 February 2006, after the conclusion of a trilateral agreement between Thailand, Laos, and France, the French Development Agency announced that it had approved funding for a second phase of the Thanaleng railway—an extension to Vientiane. The cost of this second phase was estimated at US$13.2 million, including the cost of feasibility studies, infrastructure, and equipment. A US$50 million loan was also reportedly received from the Thai government for the extension. Construction was originally slated to begin in December 2010, and Lao railway officials had confirmed as late as September 2010 that plans would go ahead. Khamsavath station will be completed by June 2022 and open mid-2023.

After reviewing the project, Lao officials decided that Thanaleng station would be converted into a terminal for freight trains crossing over the Thai–Lao Friendship Bridge; freight could then be transported from Bangkok into Laos at a lower cost than would be possible with road transport. The Vientiane–Boten railway and the connecting Yuxi–Mohan railway to Kunming opened in December 2021.

Thailand decided to finance its part of the route itself, although only the high-speed route Bangkok – Nakhon Ratchasima is to be built for the time being. After several postponements, the Bangkok (Bang Sue Grand Station) to Nakhon Ratchasima high-speed rail project (Phase 1) was officially launched by the Thai government in October 2020. However, the Nakhon Ratchasima to  Nong Khai section (Phase 2) and the Nong Khai to Vientiane section (Phase 3) has not yet been confirmed.

Facilities

Passenger

Thanaleng station is in a somewhat isolated area southeast of Vientiane, in Dongphosy village. Travellers arriving at the station must arrange their own travel onward into Vientiane, or use tuk-tuks or buses that may be stationed there to await travellers. A transfer counter now operates at the station, where passengers requiring transfer into Vientiane pay a flat rate for transportation into the city, by tuk-tuk or minivan.

Lao tourist visas are available on arrival at Thanaleng. Entry and exit fees are collected at the station upon embarking or disembarking.

As of September 2010, an estimated 2,500 to 3,000 passengers were using the Nong Khai–Thanaleng Shuttle train daily. Trains consist of two coaches, each carrying up to 80 passengers. Tickets onward to Bangkok may be purchased at the station; passengers travelling through must alight the train at Nong Khai to pass through Thai customs and immigration.

Cargo
On 4 December 2021, a day after opening the China–Laos railway, the Vientiane Logistics Park, one of a total of nine logistics centers in Laos, was officially opened by Prime Minister Phankham Viphavanh at Thanaleng.

In July 2022, the transhipment yard between the Laos-Thai meter gauge railway and Laos-China standard gauge railway was officially inaugurated at Tanaleng (Vientiane South).

Train services
 Local No. 481/482 Nong Khai–Thanaleng–Nong Khai
 Local No. 483/484 Nong Khai–Thanaleng–Nong Khai

See also
 Transport in Laos
 Kunming–Singapore railway
 Northeastern Line (Thailand)
 Boten–Vientiane railway

Notes and references
References

External links

 Thai-Laos Rail Link, Thailand. Railway-technology.com.
Video
 Train crossing the 1st (THAI-LAO) Friendship Bridge
 Thanaleng Station

Railway stations in Laos
Buildings and structures in Vientiane
Railway stations opened in 2009